Jeunesse Sportive de Kasbah Tadla (JSKT) are a Moroccan football club founded in 1946, based in the town of Kasba Tadla. The club plays in the First Division in Morocco, since the 2010–11 season.

History 
JS de Tadla were promoted to Botola 2 (D2) in 2009.

In 2010, after just one season in Botola 2, the club were Second Division Champions, and were promoted to the Botola (1st division).

In 2011 after only one season in Botola (1st division), the club was relegated to the second division of Moroccan football Botola 2 along with KAC Marrakech after having finished last in the division.

Honours 
Botola 2: 1
2010

Champion du Maroc GNFA 1 - Groupe Centre: 1
2009

Notes and references

External links

Football clubs in Morocco
Association football clubs established in 1946
1946 establishments in Morocco
Sports clubs in Morocco
Béni Mellal-Khénifra